The problem of other minds is a philosophical problem traditionally stated as the following epistemological question: Given that I can only observe the behavior of others, how can I know that others have minds? The problem is that knowledge of other minds is always indirect. The problem of other minds does not negatively impact social interactions due to people having a "theory of mind" - the ability to spontaneously infer the mental states of others - supported by innate mirror neurons, a theory of mind mechanism, or a tacit theory.  There has also been an increase in evidence that behavior results from cognition which in turn requires consciousness and the brain.

It is a problem of the philosophical idea known as solipsism: the notion that for any person only one's own mind is known to exist. The problem of other minds maintains that no matter how sophisticated someone's behavior is, that does not reasonably guarantee the same presence of thought occurring in the self. However, it is often disregarded by most philosophers as outdated. Behavior is recognized to occur due to a number of processes within the brain quelling much of the debate on this problem.

Phenomonology studies the subjective experience of human life resulting from consciousness.

See also

 Animal consciousness
 Binding problem
 Boltzmann brain
 Brain in a vat
 Chinese room
 Dream argument
 Explanatory gap
 Hard problem of consciousness
 Mind–body problem
 Open individualism
 Philosophical skepticism
 Philosophical zombie
 Philosophy of mind
 Psychophysics
 Qualia
 Turing test
 Theory of mind
 Vertiginous question

References

Further reading

External links

 



Problem of other minds, theP
Concepts in epistemology
Other minds